Jelfs is a surname. Notable people with the surname include:

 Kim Jelfs, computational chemist
 Lizzie Jelfs (born 1976), British tennis player
 Paul Jelfs (born 1953), Australian rugby union and rugby league player

See also
 Jelf